was a Japanese politician of the Democratic Party of Japan, a member of the House of Representatives in the Diet (national legislature). A native of Fukuoka, Fukuoka and graduate of Chuo University, he was elected to the House of Representatives for the first time in 1990 as a member of the Japan Socialist Party. He followed in the steps of his grandfather Jiichirō Matsumoto and father in command of the Buraku Liberation League. He was vice-chairman Buraku Liberation League when he suppression of free speech.

He resigned from the post of the Minister of Reconstruction and vice-chairman of the Buraku Liberation League after making harsh and abrasive criticism of the two governors from the area affected by the Great East Japan earthquake as well as threatening to ruin the career of any journalists who reported his remarks. He later apologised and then blamed his behaviour on his Fukuoka background and also on his B-blood type, a popular superstition in Japan.
 
He criticized Matsumoto's intimidation that "Your company is over if you publicize my remarks" as the essence of the liberation alliance.
 He died of lung cancer on July 21, 2018, at the age of 67.

References

External links 
  

1951 births
2018 deaths
People from Fukuoka
Chuo University alumni
Members of the House of Representatives (Japan)
Social Democratic Party (Japan) politicians
Democratic Party of Japan politicians
Government ministers of Japan
21st-century Japanese politicians
Deaths from lung cancer in Japan